Khalid bin Saud Al Saud can refer to:
Khalid bin Saud Al Saud (1811–1865) 
Khalid bin Saud Al Saud (1925–2020)